Mr. Veliky Novgorod is a 1984 Soviet war film directed by Aleksei Saltykov.

Plot 
The film takes place in August 1941, when Novgorod was preparing for defense. The city committee receives an order to leave the city. They go underground and organize a partisan movement there.

Cast 
 Oleg Strizhenov
 Vyacheslav Yezepov
 Zinaida Kirienko
 Elena Antonenko
 Lionella Pyryeva
 Mikhail Zhigalov	
 Aleksandr Zhigalov	
 Aleksandr Kuznetsov	
 Dmitri Balashov
 Dmitri Pisarenko
 Aleksandr Kazakov

References

External links 
 

1984 films
1980s Russian-language films
Soviet war films
Soviet World War II films
Russian World War II films